The UK and Ireland Poker Tour (UKIPT) started in December 2009, is a major regional poker tour in the United Kingdom and Ireland. The UKIPT is sponsored by PokerStars.com, like its counterparts, the European Poker Tour (2004), Asia Pacific Poker Tour (2007), Latin American Poker Tour (2008) and North American Poker Tour (2010). Season 2 of the UKIPT was shown on terrestrial television in the UK on Channel 4 and was hosted by Nick Wealthall and Liv Boeree.

Season 1

Season 2

Season 3

Season 4

Season 5

UKIPT Grand Final 
The 2010 UKIPT Grand Final, which doubled as the EPT London, was the largest ever tournament in the UK, attracting 848 entrants. This event also hosted a Tournament of Champions, with each of the nine regional leg winners competing for entry into all of the season 2 events. This tournament was also won by UKIPT London winner, David Vamplew.

Winners by country

Up to Season 5

Notes

External links 
Official site
Facebook page
Twitter page
Official Sponsor

 
Poker tournaments in Europe
Recurring events established in 2009
2009 establishments in Ireland
2009 establishments in the United Kingdom